The 2013–14 Melbourne Heart FC season was the club's fourth since its establishment in 2009. The club participated in the A-League for the fourth time. This season was the club's last season under the "Melbourne Heart" name. After being taken over and rebranded by Manchester City, from mid-2014 onwards, the club was to be called "Melbourne City FC".

Players

Squad information

From youth squad

Transfers in

Transfers out

Technical staff

Statistics

Squad statistics

Goal scorers

Home attendance

Pre-season and friendlies

Competitions

Overall

A-League

League table

Results summary

Results by round

Matches

Awards
 Player of the Week (Round 8) – Andrea Migliorini
 Player of the Week (Round 15) – Mate Dugandžić

References

External links
 Official website

2013-14
2013–14 A-League season by team